Lorenzo Marsili (born 1984) is an Italian philosopher, political activist, and social entrepreneur.

Life and career 
Marsili was born in Rome, Italy. At 21, after graduating in philosophy from the University of London, he established the Postanalytic Group in protest against the hegemony of analytical philosophy in the UK. Soon after he founded the quarterly cultural review Naked Punch together with contributors such as Noam Chomsky, Gayatry Spivak and Jacques Ranciere.

After spending time in China and obtaining a second degree from the School of Oriental and African Studies he launched Transnational Dialogues, an exchange program between Chinese and European artists and activists. In 2007, on the 50th anniversary of the Treaties of Rome, he established pan-European network European Alternatives, developing it into an international NGO with offices in London, Berlin, Paris and Rome. He established Transeuropa Festival and was the artistic director of the first four editions.

In 2013 he launched the European Media Initiative, gathering 200,000 signatures to demand an EU directive on media freedom.

In 2016, he became one of the initiators of the pan-European movement DiEM25, together with Yanis Varoufakis.

He writes for various European newspapers, including The Guardian, El Diario, El País, Al Jazeera, Neues Deutschland, Il manifesto, Il Fatto Quotidiano, Huffington Post, OpenDemocracy. Marsili appears as a guest on Italian national TV (Rai3 and La7), Al Jazeera and is host of TalkReal, a nomadic Europe-wide talk show.

Political views
Marsili is a staunch advocate of transnationalism and of the construction of a new cultural and political vision beyond the nation state. In his books Il Terzo Spazio and Citizens of Nowhere he responds directly to the crisis of the European Union and the rise of the nationalist right by proposing a third way between the maintaining the status quo and accepting the demise of the European project. Marsili has argued that "the nation-state is not the solution, but part of the problem", while strongly criticising the existing structures of the European Union. He has been defined as "the Italian response to the euro-sceptics", and is an outspoken advocate of the need for pan-European political parties.

In a booklet written together with Niccolo Milanese, he has argued for the need of a pan-European constituent process to draft new Treaties for the European Union. In his books Planetary Politics and La tua patria è il mondo intero (Your motherland is the entire world), he outlines a comprehensive transnational vision merging European cosmopolitanism with Chinese thought.

In the light of the COVID-19 pandemic in May 2020, Marsili and Ulrike Guérot called for a "European republic of equals" where every citizen could enjoy the same social protections, benefit from the same economic support and pay the same taxes.

Bibliography 
In English

 Towards a transnational democracy in Europe (with Niccolò Milanese), European Alternatives, 2015
 Citizens of Nowhere, Zed Books, 2018
 Planetary Politics, Polity, 2020

In Italian

 Il terzo spazio (with Yanis Varoufakis), Laterza, 2017
 La tua patria è il mondo intero, Laterza, 2019

In German

 Wir heimatlosen Weltbürger, Suhrkamp Verlag, 2018

References 

1984 births
Living people
Italian activists
Italian philosophers
Social entrepreneurs